In the Claws of Brightness (Filipino: Sa mga Kuko ng Liwanag), is a 1986 Tagalog language novel written by Filipino author Edgardo M. Reyes, originally serialized in Liwayway magazine from 1966 to 1967.  The title In the Claws of Brightness is a word-for-word literal translation of the Tagalog title, which as a phrase effectively makes little sense in English. A more practical English translation would be At the Verge of Dawn. The story became the basis for the award-winning Filipino film, Manila in the Claws of Light.

Summary
Julio, a poor fisherman, goes to Manila to search for his betrothed named Ligaya. Sometime before Julio's trip, Ligaya had left with a lady named Mrs. Cruz in order to study and work in the city.  Now in Manila, Julio becomes a victim to some of the city's scums.  Julio experiences abuses while working in a construction site. He eventually loses his job and desperately looks for a decent place where he can sleep. Slowly, Julio develops a cynical demeanor as he gradually loses hope of ever finding Ligaya.

All this is put on hold, however, when Julio finally reunites Ligaya, and learns from her that she is a victim of white slavery.  Julio and Ligaya plan to escape.

Film adaptation
The 1975 adaptation of the book entitled Manila in the Claws of Light was directed by award-winning director Lino Brocka. The script was written by Clodualdo del Mundo, Jr. Jose Capino, writing for Criterion, noted that the film was met with "charges of anti-Chinese racism from reviewers."

Translation
The book had been translated into Japanese by Motoe Terami-Wada.  The novel, retitled as  had become a bestselling book in Japan.

See also
Satanas sa Lupa

References

External links
Excerpt of Sa mga Kuko ng Liwanag by Edgardo M. Reyes from Panitikan sa Pilipinas (Literature in the Philippines)] (Tagalog) at books.google.com

Philippine novels
1986 novels
Tagalog-language novels
Novels set in Manila
Philippine novels adapted into films